Lily Rabe (born June 29, 1982) is an American actress. She is best known for her multiple roles on the FX anthology horror series American Horror Story (2011–2021). For her performance as Portia in the Broadway production of The Merchant of Venice, she received a nomination for the Tony Award for Best Actress in a Play.

Her film credits include What Just Happened (2008), All Good Things (2010), Pawn Sacrifice (2014), Miss Stevens (2016), Golden Exits (2017), Vice (2018), Fractured (2019) and The Tender Bar (2021). On television, Rabe appeared in the series The Whispers (2015), The Undoing (2020), The Underground Railroad (2021) and The First Lady (2022).

Early life
Rabe was born on New York City's Upper West Side, the daughter of playwright David Rabe and actress Jill Clayburgh. She has a younger brother, Michael, an actor and playwright; and an older paternal half-brother, Jason, a musician. Her father is Roman Catholic, her maternal grandfather was Jewish, and her maternal grandmother was Protestant. Rabe was raised in Bedford, New York, but moved to Lakeville, Connecticut when she was in seventh grade, where she attended the Hotchkiss School.

Rabe studied dance for ten years. She was teaching ballet at a summer arts program in Connecticut when she was approached by the program's acting instructor, who asked her to perform a monologue in the final production. She read a monologue from the play Crimes of the Heart by Beth Henley. She said, "It was that moment, performing that monologue, that made me think, 'Maybe this is what I wanna do'." She then went on to study acting at Northwestern University, graduating in 2004.

Career

Early years
In 2001, Rabe made her screen debut opposite her mother Jill Clayburgh in the film Never Again. She made her professional stage debut, again opposite her mother, at the Gloucester Stage Company in Massachusetts. She starred in two one-act plays, Speaking Well of the Dead by Israel Horovitz and The Crazy Girl by Frank Pugliese, roles that enabled her to get an Equity Card. In July 2003, she returned to the Gloucester Stage Company to appear in Proof by David Auburn. That year, she also appeared in the film Mona Lisa Smile. After graduating, she moved back to New York. From September 29 through October 2, 2004, she appeared in White Jesus by Deirdre O'Connor, one of a series of one-act plays presented as The Democracy Project from the Naked Angels Theater Company.

On January 21, 2005, she took part in a workshop production of The Best Little Whorehouse in Texas at the Roundabout Theatre Company, directed by Joe Mantello. She made her Broadway debut as Annelle Dupuy-Desoto in the 2005 revival of Steel Magnolias by Robert Harling, directed by Jason Moore for which she was nominated for a Drama Desk Award. She had been cast in the play Sisters of the Garden, but had to drop out after being cast in Steel Magnolias. From September through to October 2005, she appeared in the American premiere of Colder Than Here by English playwright Laura Wade at the MCC Theater, prompting New York Magazine'''s Jeremy McCarter to call her performance "one of the best breakthroughs" of 2005. From September to December 2006, she played Ellie Dunn in Roundabout Theatre Company's production of Heartbreak House by George Bernard Shaw. In 2007, she appeared in the film No Reservations.

In August 2007, Rabe appeared in Crimes of the Heart at the Williamstown Theatre Festival, the directorial debut of actress Kathleen Turner. In 2008, the production moved Off-Broadway to the Laura Pels Theatre, where it was staged by the Roundabout Theatre Company and ran from February 14 to April 13. During a rehearsal, a piece of the set fell on Rabe, leaving her with a fractured rib and causing her to miss a week of preview performances; the opening night was changed from February 7 to February 14.

In August 2008, Rabe was cast as a plainclothes cop in the pilot of the HBO 1970s drama Last of the Ninth, written by David Milch and directed by Carl Franklin. In December 2008, it was reported that HBO had decided not to pick it up as a series. That year, Rabe appeared in the films What Just Happened and The Toe Tactic, as well as two episodes of Medium. From January to March 2009, she appeared in the Broadway premiere of Richard Greenberg's 1990 play The American Plan at the Samuel J. Friedman Theatre. In 2010, she made her debut appearance at Shakespeare in the Park in a production of The Merchant of Venice, directed by Daniel J. Sullivan, that ran from June 30 to August 1. Rabe was cast as Portia, which she described as "one of the great female roles." She also co-starred in the 2010 film All Good Things.

2011–present

Rabe next starred in The Merchant of Venice, opposite Al Pacino as Shylock, in a performance described as a "smashing break-out". The production transferred to Broadway at the Broadhurst Theater, where it ran from October 19 to February 20, 2011. For her performance, she was nominated for the Tony Award for Best Actress in a Play. In March 2011, she was cast in the FOX drama pilot Exit Strategy. In July, it was confirmed that FOX had passed on the pilot. Rabe appeared again at the Williamstown Theatre Festival in a production of A Doll's House by Henrik Ibsen, where she played Nora Helmer.

In August 2011, Rabe got her first regular role on a television series, as Nora Montgomery on the FX horror series American Horror Story. She was later cast in the second season as the nun Sister Mary Eunice McKee (which she reprised in the fourth season). For the second season, she was nominated for a Critics' Choice Television Award for Best Supporting Actress in a Movie/Miniseries. She was also cast in the third season as a resurgent witch, Misty Day, a role written for her by co-creator Ryan Murphy. In the fifth season, she was a special guest star in the "Devil's Night" episode, playing Aileen Wuornos. In the sixth season, she had a main role as Shelby Miller. Rabe is one of only three actors to appear in the show's first six seasons. In 2019, for the ninth installment of the show, titled 1984, Rabe returned in the recurring role of Lavinia Richter, a distraught mother who haunts Camp Redwood, an idyllic summer retreat with a history of massacre.

Rabe appeared at the Golden Theatre in the Broadway play Seminar by Theresa Rebeck. Directed by Sam Gold, the cast included Alan Rickman, Jerry O'Connell, Hamish Linklater and Hettienne Park. It opened on November 20, 2011 and closed May 6, 2012. In May 2012, it was announced that Rabe would play actress Mary Pickford in The First, a film based on the book Pickford: The Woman Who Made Hollywood by Eileen Whitfield. She finished work in the Public Theater's production of As You Like It, part of the 50th Season of Shakespeare in the Park at the Delacorte Theatre. She played Rosalind in the production that opened on June 11, 2012 and closed on June 30, 2012. In October 2012, it was announced that Rabe would appear in We're Just Married, a film written by her father and directed by Rodrigo Garcia. Rabe was also a producer on the film. In May 2013, she made her Los Angeles stage debut in Miss Julie by August Strindberg, adapted and directed by Neil LaBute. In September 2013, she was cast as Commander Lyme in The Hunger Games: Mockingjay – Part 1 and The Hunger Games: Mockingjay – Part 2, the final two installments of The Hunger Games film series, based on the novels by Suzanne Collins. She was later replaced in the films by Gwendoline Christie due to a scheduling conflict.

On February 14, it was announced that Rabe would appear in Much Ado About Nothing as part of the 2014 Shakespeare in the Park season. The production began on June 3 and ran to July 6. In 2014, she appeared in Pawn Sacrifice, a film biopic about chess player Bobby Fischer, playing Fischer's sister Joan Targ. On February 24, it was announced that Rabe would appear with Thomas Jane and Jessica Alba in horror film The Veil. It was released on January 19, 2016 through video on demand, prior to home-media release on February 2, 2016. That day, it was announced that Rabe would star in The Visitors, a drama pilot for ABC. The pilot was later changed to The Whispers and was officially picked up by ABC in May 2014. The series premiered on June 1, 2015 and was subsequently cancelled on October 19, 2015 after one season. In May 2016, Rabe was cast in Golden Exits directed by Alex Ross Perry.

In August 2021, Rabe starred in the tenth season of American Horror Story, as Doris Gardner in the first half of the season, and as Amelia Earhart in the second. It was her first time as part of the main cast since Roanoke''.

Personal life
In December 2016, it was reported that Rabe was expecting her first child with boyfriend Hamish Linklater. She gave birth to a girl in March 2017. In June 2020, they had their second daughter. In September 2021, Rabe announced her third pregnancy with Linklater.

Filmography

Film

Television

Stage

Awards and nominations

References

External links

 
 
 

21st-century American actresses
Actresses from Connecticut
Actresses from New York City
American film actresses
American people of Jewish descent
American stage actresses
American Shakespearean actresses
American television actresses
Hotchkiss School alumni
Living people
Northwestern University School of Communication alumni
People from Bedford, New York
People from the Upper West Side
People from Salisbury, Connecticut
1982 births